The Crown Point Formation is a geologic formation in New York and Vermont. It preserves invertebrate fossils dating back to the Ordovician period. Notable fossiliferous localities within the Crown Point Formation include quarries in the towns of Panton and Isle La Motte, Vermont.

Invertebrate Fauna

See also

 List of fossiliferous stratigraphic units in New York

References
 

Ordovician geology of New York (state)
Ordovician geology of Vermont
Ordovician southern paleotemperate deposits